Freedom in Congo Square is a 2016 poetic nonfiction picture book by Carole Boston Weatherford, and illustrated by  R. Gregory Christie. It was published in hardcover by Little Bee Books.  The book is an account of 19th Century slaves in New Orleans who were able to gather in one place: Congo Square. The book was a recipient of a 2017 Caldecott Honor and Coretta Scott King Award for its illustrations.

References

2016 children's books
American picture books
Caldecott Honor-winning works